Wilhelmina "Billie" von Bremen (August 13, 1909 – July 16, 1976) was an American sprint runner. At the 1932 Summer Olympics, she won an individual bronze medal in the 100 meters and a gold medal in the 4×100 meters relay.

Life
Von Bremen graduated from Western Women's College in Ohio and ran for the Western Women's Club in her home city. She came second in the AAU meet in 1932 to Ethel Harrington. However Harrington was not meant to run and therefore von Bremen was declared the winner.

In the first heat Marie Dollinger broke the 100 metres Olympic record with a time of 12.2 seconds. This time was immediately improved by Stanisława Walasiewicz, who also set a world record. Von Bremen ran 12.0 seconds in the final to take the bronze.

She soon joined with teammates Mary Carew, Evelyn Furtsch and Annette Rogers to win the gold medal in the 4×100 meters in a world record time.

References

1909 births
1976 deaths
American people of German descent
Track and field athletes from San Francisco
American female sprinters
Athletes (track and field) at the 1932 Summer Olympics
Olympic gold medalists for the United States in track and field
Olympic bronze medalists for the United States in track and field
Medalists at the 1932 Summer Olympics
USA Outdoor Track and Field Championships winners
20th-century American women
Olympic female sprinters